The 1994 Segunda División de Chile was the 43rd season of the Segunda División de Chile.

Deportes Concepción was the tournament's champion.

Aggregate table

See also
Chilean football league system

References

External links
 RSSSF 1994

Segunda División de Chile (1952–1995) seasons
Primera B
1994 in South American football leagues